X-Men: Next Dimension (alternatively titled X-Men: Mutant Academy 3) is a fighting game, released in 2002 for the PlayStation 2, Xbox and GameCube video game consoles. It is the third installment in the X-Men: Mutant Academy fighting game series, following X-Men: Mutant Academy and X-Men: Mutant Academy 2.

Next Dimension expands upon the concept of the first two games by adding several new characters, 3D maps, and a story mode, which allows the player to fight a series of battles in between short movies that move the plot along. The game's plot serves as a sequel to the events of the comic story "Operation: Zero Tolerance".

Gameplay

The gameplay mechanics are tailored to a very gradual learning curve: super attacks are performed by pressing two punch or kick buttons simultaneously, and multi-hit combos can be executed by pressing the punch and kick buttons in a particular order (a feature similar to Darkstalkers' chain combos). The game features an extensive combo system, including normal chains, air juggles, and air launchers. In addition to the basic blocking system, players have various counterattacks available to them that can be executed by simply pressing the counterattack button and a direction on the controller. The counter-attacks are specific to the type of attack the player is countering.

The fighting stages are fully 3D rendered stages with their own layouts. As in Dead or Alive it is possible to knock an opponent to a different part of the stage, which functions as its own individual stage. In the X-Mansion, for example, an opponent can be knocked from the Hangar to the Hallway, then to the outer courtyard where, after the 2nd round, the basketball court opens up, allowing a player to be knocked back into the Hangar.

While in Story Mode, only a limited set of characters are available for each battle; Arcade Mode allows the player to select from any of the playable characters in a series of eight battles. The Two-Player Versus Mode also allows players to choose from any of the unlocked characters. The game also features a Survival Mode, in which a single player is pitted against a never-ending flow of computer-controlled opponents in a test of endurance.

In addition to the standard moves, the player can also access special and super attacks. The special attacks include blasts/beams (some of which can stun an opponent), physical attacks that have special effects (such as moving to one side before hitting) and attack throws. There are several different types of super attacks, and each have four different levels of power.
Projectile Supers: These come in two forms. The most used form is the beam, which is a continuous stream that causes a set amount of damage if it connects. The best example of this is Cyclops' Concussion Blast. There are also gun or blast projectiles which can be fired a set number of times, such as Gambit's 52 Card Pickup special.
Physical Supers: As the name implies, Physical Supers are supers that involve the character physically engaging with the opponent. Physical Supers are different from Attack Throw Supers because Physical Supers will continuously attack even if an opponent is blocking. Blob is the only character that has a Physical Super at levels 3 or 4.
Attack Throw Supers: Different and more numerous than Physical Supers, Attack Throws are attacks that only do full damage after an initial hit or grapple and are only effective if the intended victim is not performing a blocking maneuver. Most characters have at least one Attack Throw Super, and some (such as Toad or Beast) have a full arsenal of Attack Throws. Examples include Bishop's Professional Hit special, Sabertooth's Spin Cycle, and Toad's Paddletongue.
Unique Supers: These are supers that are unique to a certain character and include Sabertooth and Wolverine's Regeneration.

Many of the attacks and motions in the game are influenced by those available to the player in the Marvel vs. Capcom series. Three of Wolverine's attacks (his level 3 super, his Adamantium attack, and its super) are examples of this.

The GameCube version includes exclusive modes: Team and Practice. The Xbox version features an extra stage and the ability to play as Pyro.

Plot
Narrated by Patrick Stewart (reprising his role as Professor Charles Xavier from the X-Men movies), the game's plot is built around the Prime Sentinels retrieving the head of Bastion, and Bastion's subsequent attempt to wipe out mutant-kind. The game opens with the Prime Sentinels freeing Bastion from S.H.I.E.L.D. imprisonment, then disguising themselves and selling the defense plans of Professor Xavier's School for Gifted Youngsters -the X-Men's home and training grounds- to the Brotherhood of Mutants. The game then moves forward to Forge fighting off Mystique and Nightcrawler in a city ravaged by a Prime Sentinel invasion. The graves of Anthony Stark, Warren Worthington III, Peter Parker, and Benjamin Grimm can be seen in the background. This is revealed to be a Danger Room simulation, and the X-Men begin training their adaptivity by fighting opponents who have a tactical advantage.

During this training session, Juggernaut and the Brotherhood (consisting of Mystique, Toad, and Sabretooth) make their assault on the mansion. Xavier is curious as to the nature of their attack, worrying that it seems "too focused, almost like a distraction" and sends Forge to investigate the grounds. He discovers that the attack was a distraction, and that the grounds are now being patrolled by Prime Sentinels.

After attempting to fight off the Sentinels, Forge is abducted and the Brotherhood retreats. Restrained in the company of Bastion, the seemingly human Sentinel tells Forge he intends to use the man's mutant gift to bring about the  extinction of mutants. He steals various weapon designs from Forge's mind, including a powerful weapon capable of stripping a mutant of their powers. In an attempt to throw the X-Men off his scent, He sends the Brotherhood to different locations across the world. The X-Men split up and engage each member in a bid to find Forge and stop the Prime Sentinel. After their defeat, the Brotherhood retreats to find Magneto in the Savage Land, only to find that Magneto has been hunted down by the Sentinels as well and is no longer in control of his fortress. The X-Men, having followed the Brotherhood, also arrive and Magneto charges the Brotherhood to fight them off long enough to convince them to join forces.

With the X-Men and the Brotherhood forming a temporary alliance, the team fights their way through a legion of Sentinels, though not without losses of their own. In the end, Magneto, Wolverine, Juggernaut and Phoenix invade the tower for the final battle with Bastion. Bastion uses Magneto's trans-mat system to transport Juggernaut away from the tower, then escapes to Asteroid M, but he is followed by a piggybacking Wolverine. Wolverine, whose healing factor was disabled by the Sentinels earlier, manages to defeat Bastion. Magneto and Phoenix arrive to help Wolverine, and Magneto prevents a weakened Bastion from escaping again. The two battle, and Magneto is defeated.

When Bastion returns to the central room, he finds Phoenix, who challenges and finally defeats him. The Prime Sentinels are disbanded, and the X-Men and the Brotherhood agree to a temporary cease-fire while the wounded are restored to health. Forge is freed and reverses the effects of his weapon, restoring everything to normal. With Bastion returned to S.H.I.E.L.D., the X-Men are free to continue training to fight for a better future.

Upon reaching the ending level of Asteroid M, the player has the chance to fight Bastion as three characters: Wolverine, then Magneto, and finally Phoenix. Whether Wolverine defeats Bastion or is defeated himself, the game proceeds to Magneto's fight with Bastion. If Magneto defeats Bastion, the finale video is simply accelerated and Phoenix does not fight Bastion. If Magneto is defeated, Bastion and Phoenix comprise the final fight of the game.

Alternate endings:
 As Phoenix prepares to finish Bastion, Cyclops appears to help Phoenix. However, while they are both distracted, Bastion kills Cyclops by blasting him and leaves his lifeless body floating in space. Distraught over her husband's death, Phoenix transforms into Dark Phoenix and unleashes her fury on Bastion. Professor X detects Dark Phoenix's presence and is knocked over when Dark Phoenix destroys Asteroid M, also killing Wolverine and Magneto in the process. As Dark Phoenix flies through space, she destroys the Moon, and then turns to (presumably) destroy the Earth as well.
 Juggernaut is revealed to be alive and well, but is trapped on Mars. As he is tossing a rock, it lands on his head, to which he replies "This sucks!".

Characters
X-Men: Next Dimension features twenty-four playable characters. Many can be unlocked through gameplay in other modes, and alternate costumes for each character are also available. The main costumes for each character are based on the two main X-Men comics at the time, New X-Men and X-Treme X-Men. Of these, two are essentially mirrors of other characters, although still retaining their individuality: Phoenix is essentially similar to the unlockable Dark Phoenix, although the two differ in certain Supers (Phoenix's are more psi-based, while Dark Phoenix takes her powers from the fiery appearance of the Phoenix). Similarly, Betsy and Psylocke are essentially the same character, save that "Psylocke" is based on the Betsy Braddock's telepathic incarnation and employs a "psi-blade" emerging from her fist, and "Betsy" is based on the more recent telekinetically powered version and manifests a fully formed psionic katana in combat.

 Bastion
 Beast
 Betsy
 Bishop
 Blob
 Cyclops
 Dark Phoenix
 Forge
 Gambit
 Havok
 Juggernaut
 Lady Deathstrike
 Magneto
 Mystique
 Nightcrawler
 Phoenix
 Psylocke
 Pyro 
 Rogue
 Sabretooth
 Sentinel A
 Sentinel B
 Storm
 Toad
 Wolverine

 Xbox only.

Reception

Much like X-Men: Mutant Academy and unlike X-Men: Mutant Academy 2, X-Men: Next Dimension received mixed or average reviews. GameRankings and Metacritic gave it a score of 61.79% and 61 out of 100 for the PlayStation 2 version; 59.30% and 56 out of 100 for the Xbox version; and 62.62% and 63 out of 100 for the GameCube version. Some critics and fans said Next Dimension is the best game in the Mutant Academy franchise. Others criticized the GameCube and Xbox versions for its inspiration from Dead or Alive 3. Despite the criticism, many praised all versions for its improved gameplay, new characters, and excellent 3D environments.

References

External links

2002 video games
3D fighting games
Activision beat 'em ups
GameCube games
PlayStation 2 games
Xbox games
Multiplayer and single-player video games
Superhero video games
Video games developed in the United States
Video games set in Antarctica
Video games set in Egypt
Video games set in New York City
Video games set in New York (state)
Video games with alternate endings
X-Men: Mutant Academy